Tormentum – Dark Sorrow is a point-and-click adventure game developed and published by OhNoo Studio. The game was released for Microsoft Windows and OS X in March 2015. It was later released for Android and iOS in April 2016.

Development and release
Tormentum – Dark Sorrow was developed OhNoo Studio, a three-man development team based in Poland. Tormentums visual aesthetic is inspired by the works of painters H. R. Giger and Zdzisław Beksiński. The game was released for Microsoft Windows and OS X on 4 March 2015, after a successful crowdfunding campaign on Indiegogo and being greenlit on Steam. A game demo was made available prior to the game's full release. The game was later released for Android and iOS on 19 April 2016.

Reception

Tormentum – Dark Sorrow received positive reviews from critics, with aggregator review website Metacritic marking the game 72/100. Game Rant scored the game at 80% saying "gloomy and fascinating take on the point-and-click adventure game", citing the art style as "breathtaking". However, Game Rant also stated that the puzzles should be more inventive and writing needed work.

Sequel

The sequel titled Tormentum II was confirmed in 2018 and was scheduled to be released on 20 June 2019, but the Steam page was updated to state it will be released in 2020.

References

External links
 

2015 video games
Android (operating system) games
Crowdfunded video games
Indiegogo projects
IOS games
MacOS games
Point-and-click adventure games
Single-player video games
Video games developed in Poland
Windows games